Count Géza Teleki de Szék (28 September 1843 – 27 September 1913) was a Hungarian politician, who served as Interior Minister between 1889 and 1890. His son was Pál Teleki, who later became Prime Minister during the first half of the Second World War.

References
 Magyar Életrajzi Lexikon

1843 births
1913 deaths
People from Dej
Hungarian Interior Ministers
Geza, Teleki